The Asia Pacific Media Educator is a biannual peer-reviewed academic journal published by SAGE Publications in collaboration with the School of the Arts, English and Media of the Faculty of Law, Humanities and the Arts at the University of Wollongong (Australia).

Abstracting and indexing 
The journal is abstracted and indexed in Emerging Sources Citation Index and Scopus.

References

External links

SAGE Publishing academic journals
Publications established in 2012
Media studies journals